Lygodium (climbing fern) is a genus of about 40 species of ferns, native to tropical regions across the world, with a few temperate species in eastern Asia and eastern North America. It is the sole genus in the family Lygodiaceae  in the Pteridophyte Phylogeny Group classification of 2016 (PPG I). Alternatively, the genus may be placed as the only genus in the subfamily Lygodioideae of a more broadly defined family Schizaeaceae, the family placement used in Plants of the World Online .

Description
Lygodium are unusual in that the rachis, or midrib, of the frond is thin, flexible, and long, the frond unrolling with indeterminate growth and the rachis twining around supports, so that each frond forms a distinct vine.

Uses
Lygodium species, known as nito, are used as a source of fibers in the Philippines. The fibers are used as material for weaving, most notably of traditional salakot headgear.

As invasive species
Some Lygodium species are now considered very problematic invasive weeds in the southeastern United States. Populations of Lygodium have increased more than 12-fold over the past decade, as noted by Florida's Institute of Food and Agricultural Sciences.

Japanese climbing fern (Lygodium japonicum) was added to the Florida Noxious Weed List in 1999. It is also a major problem in pine plantations, causing contamination and harvesting problems for the pine straw industry. Old World climbing fern (Lygodium microphyllum) infests cypress swamps and other hydric sites, forming a monoculture. This massive infestation displaces all native flora and fauna, completely changing the ecosystem of the area.

Plants in this genus have basal chromosome counts of n=28, 29, 30.

Selected species

Lygodium altum (Clarke) Alderw. 1909
Lygodium articulatum A.Rich. 1832 – New Zealand (North Island).
Lygodium auriculatum (Willd.) Alston 1959
Lygodium boivinii Kuhn 1868
Lygodium borneense Alderw. 1915
Lygodium circinatum (Burm.fil.) Sw. 1806 – Tropical Asia and Australasia.
?Lygodium conforme – China.
Lygodium cubense Kunth 1815 – Cuba, Hispaniola.
?Lygodium digitatum – China.
Lygodium dimorphum Copel. 1911
Lygodium flexuosum (L.) Sw. 1801 – Southern China south to northern Australasia, Kerala(South India).
Lygodium heterodoxum Kunze 1849
Lygodium hians E.Fourn. 1873
Lygodium japonicum (Thunb.) Sw. 1801 – Japanese climbing fern. Eastern Asia south to northern Australia.
Lygodium kerstenii Kuhn 1867
Lygodium lanceolatum Desv. 1811
Lygodium longifolium (Willd.) Sw. 1803
Lygodium merrillii Copel. 1907
Lygodium microphyllum (Cav.) R. Br. 1810 – Old World climbing fern. Africa, south Asia and Australia.
?Lygodium microstachyum – China.
Lygodium oligostachyum (Willd.) Desv. 1827
Lygodium palmatum (Bernh.) Swartz  1806 – American climbing fern. Eastern United States (rare, confined to acid soils).
Lygodium polystachyum Wall. ex Moore 1859 – China.
Lygodium radiatum Prantl 1881
Lygodium reticulatum Schkuhr 1809 – Australia, Polynesia.
Lygodium salicifolium Presl 1845 – Southern China south to northern Australasia.
?Lygodium subareolatum – China.
Lygodium smithianum Presl 1845
Lygodium trifurcatum Baker 1868 – Tropical southeast Asia south to northern Australasia.
Lygodium venustum Sw. 1803
Lygodium versteeghii Christ 1909 – Tropical southeast Asia south to northern Australasia.
Lygodium volubile Sw. 1803 – Northern South America, Central America, Caribbean.
Lygodium yunnanense Ching 1959 – Southern China.
L. ×fayae Jermy & Walker 1985
L. ×lancetillanum Gómez 1980

References

External links

Flora of North America: Lygodium

C.Michael Hogan. 2010. Fern. Encyclopedia of Earth. eds. Saikat Basu and C.Cleveland. National Council for Science and the Environment. Washington DC.
Flora of China: Lygodium species list

 
Fern genera
Taxa named by Olof Swartz